{{New Testament manuscript infobox
| form   = Uncial
| number = 486''
| image  = Uncial 0186 recto & verso.jpg
| isize  = 
| caption= 
| name   = 
| sign   = 
| text   = 2 Corinthians 4:5-8.10.13
| script = Greek
| date   = 5th / 6th-century
| found  = 
| now at = Austrian National Library
| cite   = 
| size   = 18 x 15 cm
| type   = mixed
| cat    = III
| hand   = 
| note   = 
}}Uncial 0186''' (in the Gregory-Aland numbering), is a Greek uncial manuscript of the New Testament, dated paleographically to the 5th-century (or 6th).

Description 
The codex contains small parts of the Second Epistle to the Corinthians 4:5-8.10.13, on two fragments of one parchment leaf (18 cm by 15 cm). It is written in two columns per page, 17 lines per page, in uncial letters.

The text-type of this codex is mixed. Aland placed it in Category III.

This manuscript was part of the same codex to which Uncial 0224 belonged. 0224 contains 2 Corinthians 4:5,12,13. It is currently housed at the Austrian National Library (Pap. G. 3075) in Vienna.

Currently it is dated by the INTF to the 5th or 6th-century.

The codex currently is housed at the Austrian National Library (Pap. G. 39788) in Vienna.

See also 

 List of New Testament uncials
 Textual criticism

References

Further reading 

  
 

Greek New Testament uncials
5th-century biblical manuscripts
Biblical manuscripts of the Austrian National Library